ncs1 or NCS1 may refer to:
 Neuronal calcium sensor
 Neuronal calcium sensor-1
 Nucleobase Cation Symporter 1
 National Comorbidity Survey